Māris Jučers (born June 18, 1987) is a Latvian professional ice hockey goaltender who is currently a free agent having last played for HK Liepāja of the Latvian Hockey Higher League.

Between 2007 and 2011 Jučers played for the Latvian club Metalurgs Liepaja which participates in the Belarusian Extraleague. On July 19, 2011 it was announced that Māris has signed a 2-year two-way contract with Dinamo Riga.

He participated at the 2012 IIHF World Championship and 2013 IIHF World Championship as a member of the Latvia men's national ice hockey team, as well playing two out of three games in qualifying for the 2014 Olympics.

External links

1987 births
Living people
Beibarys Atyrau players
Dinamo Riga players
Latvian ice hockey goaltenders
LHC Les Lions players
HK Liepājas Metalurgs players
EHC Lustenau players
People from Priekule Municipality
Podhale Nowy Targ players